Nellie Bellflower (born May 1, 1946) is an American actress, voice artist, and producer.

Early life, family and education
Bellflower was born in Phoenix, Arizona.

Career 
Bellflower provided the voice of Princess Ariel in the Ruby-Spears animated television series Thundarr the Barbarian. She was also a voice actress for The Last Unicorn and The Return of the King. She acted in Americathon, the miniseries East of Eden, and in guest roles on various TV  series such as Barnaby Jones, Barney Miller, Starsky & Hutch, and Happy Days (as Fonzie's ex-fiancée Maureen Johnson, in the Season 2 episode "Fonzie's Getting Married". 

Nellie has been involved in movie production with three projects: The Girl in Melanie Klein (2008), Miss Pettigrew Lives for a Day (2008) and Finding Neverland (2004), for which she was nominated for an Academy Award as Producer for Best Picture.

Personal life 
Bellflower is married to Michael Mislove.

Filmography

Film

Television

References

External links

American television actresses
American voice actresses
1946 births
Actresses from Phoenix, Arizona
Living people
20th-century American actresses
21st-century American women